Gerald Michael Orlando Bridgeman, 6th Earl of Bradford, TD, DL, JP (29 September 1911 – 30 August 1981), styled Viscount Newport between 1915 and 1957, was a British peer and soldier.

Background
He was the only son of Orlando Bridgeman, 5th Earl of Bradford and his wife Hon. Margaret Cecilia Bruce, eldest daughter of Henry Bruce, 2nd Baron Aberdare. In 1957, he succeeded his father as earl. Bridgeman was educated at Harrow School and went then to Trinity College, Cambridge, where he graduated with a Bachelor of Arts in 1932. In 1961, he received a Master of Arts from Trinity College.

Career
Bridgeman was commissioned in 1938 in the Shropshire Yeomanry, Royal Armoured Corps, part of the Territorial Army and fought in the regiment as part of the Royal Artillery in Italy in the Second World War. He was mentioned in despatches and was decorated with the Territorial Decoration. On his retirement in 1962, he was granted the rank of a captain.

Elected in 1955, Bridgeman was president of the Country Landowners' Association for two years. In 1975, he received the Bledisloe Gold Medal for Landowners by the Royal Agricultural Society of England.

Bridgeman was Justice of the Peace for Shropshire from 1949 and became Deputy Lieutenant of that county two years later. He was appointed Crown Estate Commissioner in 1956, a post he held until 1968. In 1970, he was nominated Vice Lord Lieutenant.

He owned land in Castle Bromwich, Warwickshire.

Family
On 31 October 1946, he married Mary Willoughby Montgomery (died 1986), elder daughter of Lieutenant-Colonel Thomas Hassard Montgomery (22 June 1872 – 19 February 1953) and Hester Frances Dames-Longworth (12 May 1894 – 1954). They had four children:

Richard Thomas Orlando Bridgeman, 7th Earl of Bradford (b. 3 October 1947)
Lady Serena Mary Bridgeman (July 1 1949-January 16 2001) married Richard Andrew (died 2000) on April 27 1978 and divorced in 1989. 
Lady Caroline Louise Bridgeman (born 18 April 1952), married Brian Garnell on October 5 1974. they have four children:
Tara Serena Clare Garnell (b. October 21 1983)
Thomas Henry Michael Garnell (b. 1986)
Benedict Charles Orlando Garnell (b. 1990)
Daniel Gerald Orlando Garnell (b. 1993)
The Honorable Charles Gerald Orlando Bridgeman (born 25 June 1954), married Nicola Sales on January 17 1982. They have three sons:
James Edward Charles Orlando Bridgeman (b. March 22 1978)
Robert Gerald Orlando Bridgeman (b. May 19 1983)
Nicholas Francis Orlando Bridgeman (b. June 2 1991)

Bridgeman died in 1981 and was succeeded in his titles by his older son Richard.

References

External links
 

1911 births
1981 deaths
Alumni of Trinity College, Cambridge
British Army personnel of World War II
Deputy Lieutenants of Shropshire
6
People educated at Harrow School
Shropshire Yeomanry officers
Gerald
Royal Armoured Corps officers
Royal Artillery officers